= Facebook emotional manipulation experiment =

Facebook controversy

In 2012, Facebook, Inc. conducted one-week experiment where they tried manipulating people their emotions negatively. It was revealed in 2014.

== Reaction by Facebook ==
The leader of the experiment Adam D. I. Kramer, apologized for the experiment and suggested that the results were insignificant and not worth the anxiety that the reports of the experiment.
